Inga Paškovska (born 20 January 1992) is a cross-country skier from Latvia. Her World Cup debut came in 2017. Inga Paškovska is set to compete for Latvia at the 2018 Winter Olympics.

References 

1992 births
Living people
Cross-country skiers at the 2018 Winter Olympics
Latvian female cross-country skiers
Olympic cross-country skiers of Latvia
Latvian female biathletes